Valley Australian Football Club was an Australian rules club which played in the Queensland Football League and QANFL from 1905 to 1927. They competed at Albion Park in Brisbane and had dark blue club colours. Nicknamed the Valleys, the club merged with Brisbanes Football Club (not to be confused with the earlier Brisbane Football Club) in 1928.

Honours

Premierships (3)
 1912
 1913
 1925

See also

External links
Fullpointsfooty

Valley
Australian rules football clubs in Brisbane
1928 disestablishments in Australia
Australian rules football clubs established in 1905
Fortitude Valley, Queensland
1905 establishments in Australia
Australian rules football clubs disestablished in 1928